Wright's Ferry Mansion is a historic home located in Columbia, Lancaster County, Pennsylvania. It was built in 1738, and is a -story, rectangular limestone dwelling with a gable roof and pent eave.  It was built for Susanna Wright, an English Quaker poet and businesswoman, and its architecture reflects a mix of English and Germanic elements.

It was listed on the National Register of Historic Places in 1979.

The house was restored to appear as in 1750 and is open to the public several days a week from May through October.

References

External links 
 Lancaster County Tourism: Wright's Ferry Mansion
 "Following Forbes' footsteps: Two restored 18th-century houses draw visitors to Lancaster area", Pittsburgh Post-Gazette, May 25, 2008

Houses on the National Register of Historic Places in Pennsylvania
Houses completed in 1738
Houses in Lancaster County, Pennsylvania
Museums in Lancaster County, Pennsylvania
Historic house museums in Pennsylvania
National Register of Historic Places in Lancaster County, Pennsylvania